The Hashimids were an Arab family who ruled over Bab al-Abwab (Darband) in Daghestan from 869 to 1075.

References

Sources 
 
 
 
 
 

Positions of authority
Arab dynasties
Derbent